Catenary may refer to:

Catenary, a mathematical curve
Catenary arch, an arch that follows a catenary curve
Catenary ring, a type of mathematical ring
Overhead catenary, another name for the overhead line system for electric power transmission for railways